Wekilbazar District is a district of Mary Province in Turkmenistan. The administrative center of the district is the town of Mollanepes.

Awards
Wekilbazar District won the award of "best district" in the country for 2017.

References

Districts of Turkmenistan
Mary Region